Mikulino is the name of several rural localities in Russia:
Mikulino, Moscow Oblast, a selo in Mikulinskoye Rural Settlement of Lotoshinsky District in Moscow Oblast; 
Mikulino, Loknyansky District, Pskov Oblast, a village in Loknyansky District of Pskov Oblast
Mikulino, Sebezhsky District, Pskov Oblast, a village in Sebezhsky District of Pskov Oblast
Mikulino, Ryazan Oblast, a village in Mikulinsky Rural Okrug of Miloslavsky District in Ryazan Oblast
Mikulino, Smolensk Oblast, a village in Perevolochskoye Rural Settlement of Rudnyansky District in Smolensk Oblast
Mikulino, Republic of Tatarstan, a selo in Aznakayevsky District of the Republic of Tatarstan